Eduardo Jorge Fereda Merchan (born 6 March 1926) was a Venezuelan diver. He competed in the men's 3 metre springboard event at the 1952 Summer Olympics.

Notes

References

External links
 

1926 births
Possibly living people
Venezuelan male divers
Olympic divers of Venezuela
Divers at the 1952 Summer Olympics
People from San Cristóbal, Táchira
Venezuelan male trampolinists
Pan American Games medalists in gymnastics
Gymnasts at the 1955 Pan American Games
Pan American Games bronze medalists for Venezuela
Medalists at the 1955 Pan American Games
20th-century Venezuelan people